Andreas Musalus (ca. 1665/6 – ca. 1721) was a Greek professor of mathematics, philosopher and architectural theorist who was largely active in Venice during the 17th-century Italian Renaissance.

Biography 

Andreas Musalus was born to a noble Greek family in 1665, in Candia on the island of Crete. His family were originally from Constantinople and his father was a doctor by profession. Due to the Ottoman conquest of Crete the family migrated to Venice when Andreas was an infant. Andreas began studying in his adolescence, he ultimately studied law and mathematics at the University of Padua. Whilst in Padua Musalus studied the rhetoric of Pietro Paolo Calore and learned mathematics from Filippo Vernade, the Lieutenant General of Artillery of the Republic of Venice. Vernade taught Musalus mathematics of military architecture. Musalus continued his studies and made such immense progress in mathematics that in 1697 at the age of thirty two years, he was assigned to teach Mathematics in Venice. He married in the year 1707, he died in 1721, in the region of Venice.

See also
Greek scholars in the Renaissance

References

1665 births
1721 deaths
Scientists from Heraklion
Greek Renaissance humanists
Kingdom of Candia
17th-century Greek people
18th-century Greek people
University of Padua alumni
18th-century Greek scientists
18th-century Greek educators
17th-century Greek scientists
17th-century Greek educators